Blue mallee is a common name for two species of plants:

 Eucalyptus gamophylla in South Australia, Western Australia, Northern Territory
 Eucalyptus polybractea in New South Wales and Victoria